William Godwin (by 1520 – 1557), of Wells, Somerset, was an English politician.

Family
Godwin's family were from Wells. He had four sons and four daughters.

Career
He was a Member (MP) of the Parliament of England for Wells in March 1553 and November 1554.

References

1557 deaths
People from Wells, Somerset
Year of birth uncertain
English MPs 1553 (Edward VI)
English MPs 1554–1555